Gowri may refer to
 Parvati, a Hindu goddess
 Gowri (given name)
 Gowri (1963 film), an Indian Kannada film
 Gowri (2004 film), a Telugu film
 Gowri, Fars, a village in Iran
 Gowri, Iran (disambiguation)